The Nepalese Army participated in World War I with The First Rifle, Kalibox, Sumsher Dal, Jabbar Jung, Pashupati Prasad, Bhairab Nath, Second Rifle, Bhairung and Srinath Battalions. The total number of NA troops deployed to India at the time was 14,000, though some sources claim it to be as 16,000. Troops were armed with the Martini-Henry and Enfield rifles. General Babar Shumsher, General Tej Shumsher and General Padma Shumsher, were the main commanders. The discipline, professionalism and adaptability of the Nepalese soldiers was again well respected in the First World War. Additionally, Nepal also sent almost two hundred thousand troops, and proportionately a higher percentage of military aged men than most countries, to fight as part of the British Indian Army itself. Nepal also provided financial aid to the British government, in the form of 1 million pounds.

Notes

References
 History of the Nepalese Army Page 4 - https://web.archive.org/web/20140226194921/http://www.nepalarmy.mil.np/history.php?page=four

WW1
Military history of Nepal
World War I by country
Nepal in World War I